Pectinodon is a genus of troodontid dinosaurs from the Late Cretaceous period (66 mya). It currently contains a single valid species, Pectinodon bakkeri (sometimes classified as Troodon bakkeri), known only from teeth.

In 1982, Kenneth Carpenter named a number of theropod teeth from the late Maastrichtian Lance Formation of Wyoming as the type species Pectinodon bakkeri. The generic name is derived from Latin pecten, "comb", and Greek ὀδών, odon, "tooth", in reference to the comb-like serrations on the rear edge of the teeth. The specific name honours Robert Thomas Bakker.

History of discovery

The holotype, UCM 38445, consists of a 6.2 mm long adult tooth. The paratypes are three juvenile teeth.

In 1985 Lev Nesov named a second species, Pectinodon asiamericanus, based on specimen CCMGE 49/12176, a tooth from the Khodzhakul Formation of Uzbekistan dating from the Cenomanian. This is today often considered a nomen dubium.

While historically considered synonymous with Troodon or more specifically the species Troodon formosus, Philip Currie and colleagues (1990) noted that the P. bakkeri fossils from the Hell Creek Formation and Lance Formation might belong to different species. In 1991, George Olshevsky assigned the Lance formation fossils to the species Troodon bakkeri. In 2011, Zanno and colleagues reviewed the convoluted history of troodontid classification in Late Cretaceous North America. They followed Longrich (2008) in treating Pectinodon bakkeri as a valid genus, and noted that it is likely the numerous Late Cretaceous specimens currently assigned to Troodon formosus almost certainly represent numerous new species, but that a more thorough review  of the specimens is required.

In 2013 Currie and Derek Larson concluded that Pectinodon bakkeri was valid and its teeth could be found both in the Lance Formation and the coeval Hell Creek Formation. Some teeth from the older Campanian Dinosaur Park Formation could not be statistically differentiated from them, likely due to an insufficiently large sample, and were referred to a cf. Pectinodon.

See also

 Timeline of troodontid research

References

Late Cretaceous dinosaurs of North America
Troodontids
Fossil taxa described in 1982
Taxa named by Kenneth Carpenter
Lance fauna
Hell Creek fauna
Paleontology in Wyoming
Maastrichtian genus first appearances
Maastrichtian genus extinctions